Mutant X may refer to:

 Mutant X (comics), a Marvel Comics series
 Proteus (Marvel Comics), a Marvel Comics fictional character, originally known as 'Mutant X' but unrelated to the series of the same name and publisher
 Mutant X (TV series), a television show produced by Marvel Studios that ran from 2001 to 2004 about four superpowered mutants, but unrelated to the Marvel comic series Mutant X